James Corson Niederman (born November 27, 1924) is an American epidemiologist whose research identified the Epstein–Barr virus as the cause of infectious mononucleosis in a study published in 1968.

Early life and education
James Corson Niederman was born on November 27, 1924, in Hamilton, Ohio. He graduated from Kenyon College in 1946, and received his medical degree from the Johns Hopkins School of Medicine in 1949. Currently, he is a residential college associate at the Yale School of Public Health.

Medical research
Beginning in the late 1950s, Dr. Niederman and Robert W. McCollum collected sera from Yale University freshmen. Students who tested positive for EBV antibodies never developed infectious mononucleosis (IM). The pre-illness samples of students, who later developed infectious mononucleosis tested negative for EBV antibodies. Therefore, the presence of EBV antibodies indicated immunity from infectious mononucleosis. The study demonstrated that EBV is not simply a passenger virus, it is the etiologic agent of infectious mononucleosis. This was a remarkable discovery, since at the time the cause of IM was a mystery.

See also
 Epstein–Barr virus

References

Living people
1924 births
American public health doctors
American virologists
Kenyon College alumni
Johns Hopkins University alumni
Yale University faculty
Yale School of Medicine faculty
People from Bethany, Connecticut